Carl Patrick Hilton (born February 8, 1964) is a retired professional American football player who played tight end for four seasons for the Minnesota Vikings.

References

1964 births
American football tight ends
Minnesota Vikings players
Houston Cougars football players
Living people